Alojz Ipavec, also written as Lojze Ipavic (20 May 1815  – 1849), was a Slovenian composer. In his professional life, he was a physician; as a composer, he is remembered primarily for a handful of small salon pieces.

See also
List of Slovenian composers

References
 

1815 births
1849 deaths
Slovenian composers
Male composers
19th-century Slovenian physicians
19th-century composers
Slovenian male musicians